Ricardo "Ricky" Sánchez Rosa (born July 6, 1987) is a Puerto Rican professional basketball player for Grises de Humacao of the Baloncesto Superior Nacional (BSN). He was drafted by the Portland Trail Blazers out of IMG Academy with the 35th pick of the 2005 NBA Draft, becoming the fourth Puerto Rican to be drafted by the National Basketball Association, and was immediately traded to the Denver Nuggets for their selection, Jarrett Jack. He has played for the Puerto Rican national basketball team.

Sánchez was later traded to the Philadelphia 76ers on September 10, 2007. The 76ers traded the rights to Sánchez on March 15, 2012 for Memphis Grizzlies forward Sam Young. This move inspired the name of Spike Eskin's Sixers podcast, "The Rights to Ricky Sanchez", commonly referred to as "The Ricky".  On February 21, 2013, international rights to Sánchez were traded to the Miami Heat for center Dexter Pittman and a 2013 second round draft pick in an attempt to clear roster space for the Heat.

He has played with the Idaho Stampede in the NBA Development League and the Continental Basketball Association, and in the National Superior Basketball League of Puerto Rico, with teams including the Criollos de Caguas, Humacao Grays, Santurce Crabbers, and the Mayaguez Indians, with whom he won a championship in 2012.

Career statistics

Domestic leagues

See also

Puerto Rico Men's National Basketball Team
Peter John Ramos Puerto Rican Center with a height of 7 ft 3.5 in
José Juan Barea Team Puerto Rico Point Guard and current Team Captain
Elías Larry Ayuso
Carlos Arroyo Former Team Puerto Rico Point Guard & NBA player
Jorge Brian Díaz Team Puerto Rico Center

References

External links
 NBA.com 2005 draft page - Round 2, No. 35
 rivalhoops.com profile
 Draft Profile
 Basketball Reference NBDL Player Card

1987 births
Living people
2010 FIBA World Championship players
2014 FIBA Basketball World Cup players
Baloncesto Superior Nacional players
Basketball players at the 2007 Pan American Games
Bàsquet Manresa players
Caciques de Humacao players
Cangrejeros de Santurce basketball players
Central American and Caribbean Games gold medalists for Puerto Rico
Competitors at the 2010 Central American and Caribbean Games
Estudiantes de Bahía Blanca basketball players
Halcones de Xalapa players
Idaho Stampede players
Libertad de Sunchales basketball players
Liga ACB players
National Basketball Association high school draftees
Pan American Games bronze medalists for Puerto Rico
Pan American Games medalists in basketball
People from Guayama, Puerto Rico
Portland Trail Blazers draft picks
Power forwards (basketball)
Puerto Rican men's basketball players
Puerto Rico men's national basketball team players
Regatas Corrientes basketball players
Central American and Caribbean Games medalists in basketball
Medalists at the 2007 Pan American Games
Criollos de Caguas basketball players